Bernardino Blaceo (active  1550) was an Italian painter of the Renaissance period. He painted for churches at Udine, among them, the principal altar-piece depicting Virgin and child, with Angels and Saints Lucia and Agatha’' for the church of Santa Lucia, and a Virgin and infant with Saints Peter and John’ for the church in Porta Nuova.

References

16th-century Italian painters
Italian male painters
Renaissance painters
People from Udine
Year of birth missing
Year of death missing